Homicycle is a 2014 micro-budget Canadian horror film, a parody of grindhouse fare like Nail Gun Massacre. It was filmed in Ottawa, Canada and released in the United States, August 11, 2015. It was directed by Brett Kelly and written by David A Lloyd, president of The Cousin Company Entertainment Group. The film stars Candice Lidstone, Peter Whittaker, Ian Quick, and Donna St-Jean.

Plot
When a veteran cop is murdered by an underworld figure, it sets off a brutal crime wave. A black-clad vigilante figure on a motorcycle starts picking off gangsters one by one and turning the tables on the criminals.

Reception
Rock Shock Pop says the film has "the scratchy imperfection of an improperly handled print, the icy, synth score coolly evokes the time period, and the hero, decked in black leather and a motorcycle helmet, is reminiscent to those who populated numerous exploitation films of the era..."

References

External links
 

2014 films
Canadian horror films
English-language Canadian films
Films shot in Ottawa
2010s Canadian films